Berlin Township is the name of given to 3 active and 1 defunct townships in the U.S. state of North Dakota:

Active townships
 Berlin Township, Cass County, North Dakota
 Berlin Township, Wells County, North Dakota
 Berlin Township, Sheridan County, North Dakota

Defunct townships
 Berlin Township, Richland County, North Dakota. Renamed Brandenburg Township

See also
Berlin Township (disambiguation)

North Dakota township disambiguation pages